Bouchard's nodes are hard, bony outgrowths or gelatinous cysts on the proximal interphalangeal joints (the middle joints of fingers or toes). They are seen in osteoarthritis, where they are caused by formation of calcific spurs of the articular (joint) cartilage. Much less commonly, they may be seen in rheumatoid arthritis, where nodes are caused by antibody deposition to the synovium.

Bouchard's nodes are comparable in presentation to Heberden's nodes, which are similar osteoarthritic growths on the distal interphalangeal joints, but are significantly less common.

Eponym
Bouchard's nodes are named after French pathologist Charles Jacques Bouchard (1837–1915).

See also
 Heberden's node

References

External links 

Arthropathies